Perkins & Will is a global design practice founded in 1935. Since 1986, the group has been a subsidiary of Lebanon-based Dar Al-Handasah (Arabic: دار الهندسة). Phil Harrison has been the firm's CEO since 2006.

History
The firm was established in by Lawrence Perkins (1907–1998) and Philip Will Jr. (1906–1985). Perkins and Will met while studying architecture at Cornell University. The company was founded in Chicago.

The company attracted national attention in 1940 with the Crow Island School in Winnetka, Illinois, designed in association with Eliel Saarinen and Eero Saarinen. In 1986, Dar Al-Handasah, a Lebanese consulting firm, purchased Perkins&Will. In 2016, the company had 24 global offices and 2,000 employees.

In March 2014, Perkins&Will announced its planned acquisition of The Freelon Group, led by Philip Freelon. After the close of the transaction, Freelon joined Perkins and Will's board of directors and became managing and design director of the firm's North Carolina practice.

In October 2017, Perkins&Will acquired sports and recreation architecture firm Sink Combs Dethlefs. Sink Combs Dethlefs, founded in 1962, operated offices in Denver and Chicago.

In February 2018, Perkins&Will acquired Danish practice Schmidt Hammer Lassen. Schmidt Hammer Lassen Architects, known for their extensive work in the cultural sector, were founded in 1986 with offices in Copenhagen and Shanghai.

Sustainable design
The firm's website claims to have more Leadership in Energy and Environmental Design (LEED) accredited professionals than any other design firm in North America. In 2011, Perkins&Will announced the LEED-ND (Neighborhood Development) platinum level certification for its 100th sustainable building, the Dockside Green Phase Two Balance project, located in Victoria, British Columbia.

Notable LEED projects:
 University at Buffalo's School of Engineering and Applied Sciences
 VanDusen Botanical Garden Visitor Centre, Vancouver BC - LEED Canada Platinum certified, designed to meet the Living Building Challenge
 Dockside Green in Victoria, BC.
 Great River Energy Corporate Headquarters in Maple Grove, Minnesota - a LEED Platinum Building that is the first to combine Lake Source Geo-Exchange with displacement ventilation. The building has an urban wind turbine.
 Discovery Health Center – 1st LEED NC Certified ambulatory care facility in the country.
 Arlington Free Clinic – 1st LEED CI Gold free health clinic in the USA.
 Rush University Medical Center, Orthopedic Ambulatory Building – Largest LEED CS Gold healthcare building in the country.
 Target Retail Store, San Rafael, California - the first LEED Certified store for this company.
 The Charles E. Young Research Library at UCLA achieved LEED Gold certification

Notable buildings

 Aaniin Community Centre, Markham, Ontario, Canada
 Boeing International Headquarters, Chicago, Illinois
 Bridgestone Tower, Nashville, Tennessee
 Chase Tower (Chicago), Chicago, Illinois
 The Clare, Chicago, Illinois
 Concordia International School Shanghai, Shanghai, China
 Cornell University College of Engineering, Ithaca, New York; complex of seven buildings in the 1950s, including Upson Hall
 Crow Island School, Winnetka, Illinois
 Lake Forest College, buildings in Middle and South Campus, Lake Forest, Illinois
 Duke University Fuqua School of Business, Durham, North Carolina
 Florida Atlantic University, Schmidt Biomedical Science Center
 Fort Collins High School, Fort Collins, Colorado
 GlenOak High School, Plain Township, Ohio
 International School of Beijing, Beijing, China
 Klaus Advanced Computing Building, Georgia Tech, Atlanta, Georgia
 Knight Campus, Community College of Rhode Island (1972)
 Peggy Notebaert Nature Museum, Chicago, Illinois
 Philadelphia Pennsylvania Temple, The Church of Jesus Christ of Latter-day Saints, Philadelphia, Pennsylvania
 Proviso West High School, Hillside, Illinois
 Riley Towers, Indianapolis, Indiana
 Ruth M. Rothstein CORE Center, Chicago, Illinois
 Signature Place, St. Petersburg, Florida
 SoLo House, British Columbia, Canada
 Tata Consultancy Services (TCS), Sahyadri Park Campus, Pune, India
True North Square, Winnipeg, Manitoba
 Tulane University, Mayer Residences, New Orleans, Louisiana
 Tufts University, Granoff Music Center, Boston
 University of Agostinho Neto, New Campus Master Plan, Luanda, Angola
 University of Illinois at Urbana-Champaign, Temple Hoyne Buell Hall, Champaign, Illinois
 University of Miami, School of Communication, Miami, Florida
 University of Pennsylvania, Biomedical Research Building II, Philadelphia, Pennsylvania

 University of Southern California, Zilkha Neurogenetic Institute, Los Angeles, California

Antilia, Mumbai, Maharashtra, India
 235 Van Buren, Chicago, Illinois
 Princess Nourah Bint Abdul Rahman University, Riyadh, Saudi Arabia.
 University Health System 2012 expansion project, San Antonio, Texas.
 Texas A&M University, Memorial Student Center 2012 Renovation, College Station, Texas.
 University at Buffalo, Davis Hall Building, UB's North Campus, Amherst, NY
 Xi’an Jiaotong-Liverpool University, North Campus, Suzhou, China
 SRM University, Amaravati, India

Awards
 2015 American Planning Association's National Planning Excellence Award for a Planning Firm
 2010 National Building Museum's Honor Award for Civic Innovation, the first architectural firm to be a recipient.
 2010 Honor Award for Civic Innovation from the National Building Museum
 2009 and 2008 Practice Greenhealth Champion for Change Award
 2009 COTE Top 10 Green Projects, Dockside Green and Great River Energy
 2008 BusinessWeek and Architectural Record "Good Design is Good Business" Award for Haworth Headquarters
 2008 CoreNet Sustainability Leadership Award for Sustainable Development
 2003 National Honor Award from the AIA for Skybridge at One North Halsted, Chicago, Illinois

References

External links

 
  List of Chicago skyscrapers designed by Perkins&Will
  List of Perkins&Will buildings
 Oral History interview regarding history of firm

Design companies established in 1935
1935 establishments in Illinois
Architects from Chicago